Rawhide is an American Western TV series starring Eric Fleming and Clint Eastwood. The show aired for eight seasons on the CBS network on Friday nights, from January 9, 1959, to September 3, 1965, before moving to Tuesday nights from September 14, 1965, until December 7, 1965, with a total of 217 black-and-white episodes. The series was produced and sometimes directed by Charles Marquis Warren, who also produced early episodes of Gunsmoke. The show is fondly remembered by many for its theme, "Rawhide".

Spanning  years, Rawhide was the sixth-longest running American television Western, exceeded only by 8 years of Wagon Train, 9 years of The Virginian, 14 years of Bonanza, 18 years of Death Valley Days, and 20 years of Gunsmoke.

Synopsis

Set in the 1860s, Rawhide portrays the challenges faced by the drovers of a cattle drive. Most episodes are introduced with a monologue by Gil Favor (Eric Fleming), trail boss. In a typical Rawhide story, the drovers come upon people on the trail and involve themselves in other people's affairs, usually encountering various corrupt individuals. Many times, one or more of the crew venture into a nearby town and encounter some trouble from crooked townspeople or lawless politicians from whom they need to be rescued. Rowdy Yates (Clint Eastwood) was young and at times impetuous in the earliest episodes, and Favor had to keep a tight rein on him.

Favor is a savvy and strong leader, who always plays "square" with his fellow men – a tough customer who can handle the challenges and get the job done. (Producer Charles Warren called on the diary written in 1866 by trail boss George C. Duffield to shape the character of Favor.) Although Favor had the respect and loyalty of the men who worked for him, the people, including Yates, are insubordinate to him a few times, after working too hard or after receiving a tongue lashing. Favor has to fight at times and usually wins.

Some Rawhide stories were easy in production terms, but the peak form of the show was convincing and naturalistic, and sometimes brutal. Its story lines ranged from parched plains to anthrax, ghostly riders to wolves, cattle raiding, bandits, murderers, and others. A frequent story line was the constant need to find water for the cattle. The scout spent much of his time looking for water, sometimes finding that water holes and even rivers had dried up. In some ways, the show was similar to the TV series Wagon Train, which had debuted on NBC on September 18, 1957. For example, neither the wagon train nor the herd moved very much.

Rawhide frequently dealt with controversial topics. Robert Culp played an ex-soldier on the drive who had become dangerously addicted to morphine. Mexican drover Jesús faced racism at times from outside of the crew.

Several shows deal with the aftermath of the American Civil War, which ended four years earlier. The "Poco Tiempo" episode reveals that Yates' father's name was Dan, that Yates came from Southwestern Texas, that he joined the Confederate States Army at 16, and that he was later held in a federal prison camp.

Favor also served in the CSA as a captain. "Incident on the Edge of Madness" in season one, guest-starring Lon Chaney Jr., had Favor's old commanding officer attempting to enlist the aid of Favor and his men to start the "New Confederacy of Panama" much to Favor's dismay. In that same episode, Favor and Nolan were revealed to have been in the Confederate forces up on Marye's Heights at the Battle of Fredericksburg, and they "felt shamed" at killing so many Union soldiers.

Some American Indians demanded cattle as payment for going through their land. Rough characters were in the shows, and in one episode, Gil Favor is tortured by having his face held near a fire. In "Incident of the Town in Terror", people think that a sick Yates has "the plague" (anthrax), and they enforce at gunpoint a quarantine of the cattle drovers outside the town. Also, cattle rustlers were around, including Commancheros.

On occasions, Rawhide was eerily atmospheric. "Incident with an Executioner" featured a mysterious dark rider (Dan Duryea) seen on the hillside following the herd, "Incident of the Haunted Hills" featured a sacred Indian burial ground, "Incident of the Druid Curse" and season two's "Incident of the Murder Steer" (where anyone sighting a rogue steer with "Murder" carved on its side soon after dies, based on an actual legend of the Old West). The series also featured episodes with ghost towns, cattle with horns lit up by St. Elmo's fire at dusk, cowboys struck by lightning, plus a strange, totally enclosed gypsy wagon, apparently steering itself, repeatedly turning up, all stand out as curiously "spooky" tales for a bustling dusty cattle drive; the show's often stark incidental music suited these stories perfectly.

In episode 67, "Incident Near the Promised Land" (most episode titles began with "Incident" until Bruce Geller and Bernard L. Kowalski became the producers for season six), the cattle drive finally reached Sedalia for the first time in the series. Unusually, episode 68 continues on from that, where the cattle have been sold and the men celebrate in town and decide on their futures with even Favor thinking of leaving the business. Instead of the usual ending, wherein Favor gives the command "Head 'em up! Move 'em out!" and the cattle move off, this episode had the end titles over a view of a Sedalia street.

Episode 69 has Favor visiting his two daughters, Gillian and Maggie, who live with their aunt Eleanor Bradley in Philadelphia. In episode 70, a number of the men are back together and heading back to San Antonio about 650 miles away, with a herd of horses (used in the titles) instead of cattle. Episode 71 has a new cattle drive ready to go, but the owner of 1600 of the cattle wants to be in charge, so Favor reluctantly signs on as a ramrod, but after problems, Favor becomes boss again at the end of the show. These five episodes made up one storyline instead of the usual single-episode stories, which could have been set anywhere in the West.

Favor had many bad moments in the series, but none worse than the "Lost Herd" episode. Close to drive's finish, Favor wants to beat another herd to town to get the best prices. He takes a narrow shortcut; due to thunder and lightning, the herd stampedes over the cliffs, leaving him just 9 out of 3000 cattle when the drive reaches town. He does not have the money to pay the drovers and has to face the owner (Royal Dano), whose cattle he has lost, knowing that he might never work in the business again.

From the second season, episodes began to feature individual cast members, notably Clint Eastwood's Yates (sole star in "Incident on the Day of the Dead", which opens season two); later, both Scout Pete Nolan (Sheb Wooley) and even cook G. W. Wishbone (Paul Brinegar) were featured as leads, while Fleming's Gil Favor remained in overall charge.

Pete Nolan (Wooley), the scout, departs as a regular cast member after "The Deserter's Patrol" (season four, episode 18, 9 Feb 1962), but returns for a single episode "Reunion" (episode 26, 6 April 1962), and for a further nine episodes in season seven from "Texas Fever" (episode 18, 5 February 1965).

Charles H. Gray's character Clay Forester, having played a villain in three episodes of season four (from "The Inside Man", episode six), then reforms and replaces Nolan as scout from "The Greedy Town" (season four, episode 19). Gray remained in the regular cast for the rest of seasons four and five (though in a number of later episodes, he is credited but not seen).

In the eighth and final season of Rawhide, Fleming left the series after an apparent disagreement with the producers. Rawhide had fallen in the ratings, from sixth in 1960–61 to 13th, 22nd, then 44th. Eric Fleming, who played Favor, was let go. "They fired me because they were paying me a million dollars a year" (actually $220,000), Fleming told TV Guide in 1965. Cast members Sheb Wooley, James Murdock, Rocky Shahan, and Robert Cabal were also let go. Eastwood was promoted to series star as Yates finally becomes the trail boss. This outcome was hinted at in earlier episodes when Favor indicates he is training Yates to replace him as trail boss. The impression given is this was a later cattle drive with Yates now in charge, at a time after Favor had either "retired" or given up as boss, presumably having made his money or opted for a career change, since no mention is ever made onscreen of him or the reason for his absence in the final season's episodes. In its casting of the series, Robert Carricart was originally cast as George Washington Wishbone, but was replaced by Paul Brinegar. Carricart only played the role for the series unaired pilot.

John Ireland as Jed Colby and Raymond St Jacques as Simon Blake also joined the Rawhide cast at this time, plus semiregular minor cast member David Watson as Ian Cabot. With Fleming gone, ratings plunged and the revised format only lasted 13 episodes before Rawhide was suddenly cancelled in midseason.

Cast members
Regular cast members included:
 Eric Fleming as trailboss Gil Favor (seasons 1 to 7)
 Clint Eastwood as ramrod Rowdy Yates (seasons 1 to 7) (and trailboss in season 8) 
 Sheb Wooley as scout Pete Nolan (seasons 1 to 4, later season 7 nine episodes)
 Paul Brinegar as the cantankerous cook, George Washington "Wishbone" Haggerty (seasons 1 through 8)
 Robert Cabal as the wrangler, Jesús "Hey Soos" Patines (seasons 1 to 7)
 James Murdock as Wishbone's assistant, Harkness "Mushy" Mushgrove III (seasons 1 to 7)
 Steve Raines as drover Jim Quince (seasons 1 to 7, ramrod in season 8)
 Rocky Shahan as drover Joe Scarlet (seasons 1 to 7)
 Don C. Harvey as drover Collins (seasons 1 to 4)
 John Erwin as drover Teddy (seasons 1 to 4, 6 to 7)
 John Hart as drover Narbo (season 4, two appearances in season 7)
 William R. Thompkins as drover Toothless (season 2 to 7)
 John Cole as drover Bailey (season 1 to 5, one appearance in season 6)
 Milan Smith as drover Kyle (season 1 to 2) 
 Charles H. Gray as Clay Forrester (seasons 4 and 5 only, one appearance in season 6)
 Paul Comi as Yo Yo (season 7 only)
 John Ireland as Jed Colby (season 8 only)
 Raymond St. Jacques as rider Simon Blake (season 8 only)
 David Watson as Ian Cabot (season 8 only)

Notable guest stars
 
 Nick Adams
 Claude Akins
 Eddie Albert
 Lola Albright
 Tod Andrews
 Michael Ansara
 Mary Astor
 Frankie Avalon
 Martin Balsam
 John Drew Barrymore
 Richard Basehart
 Arthur Batanides
 Charles Bateman
 Ed Begley
 Ralph Bellamy
 Shelley Berman
 Ken Berry
 James Best
 Lyle Bettger
 Robert Blake
 Neville Brand
 Beau Bridges
 Charles Bronson
 Rory Calhoun
 Macdonald Carey
 John Cassavetes
 Lon Chaney Jr.
 James Coburn
 Iron Eyes Cody
 Pat Conway
 Elisha Cook Jr.
 Jeff Corey
 Broderick Crawford
 Robert L. Crawford Jr.
 Linda Cristal
 Robert Culp
Ken Curtis
 Royal Dano
 Jim Davis
 Albert Dekker
 John Dehner
 Bruce Dern
 John Dierkes
 Troy Donahue
 Ann Doran
 Bobby Driscoll
 James Drury
 Brian Donlevy
 Dan Duryea
 Buddy Ebsen
 Barbara Eden
 Jack Elam
 Leif Erickson 
 Bill Erwin
 Gene Evans
 Jay C. Flippen
 Nina Foch
 Paul Fix
 Sally Forrest
 Steve Forrest
 Anne Francis
 James Franciscus
 Beverly Garland
 Leo Gordon
 Dabbs Greer
 Alan Hale Jr.
 Julie Harris
 Darryl Hickman
 Kim Hunter
 Rick Jason
 Chubby Johnson
 Victor Jory
 Brian Keith
 DeForest Kelley
 Douglas Kennedy
 George Kennedy
 Wright King
 Frankie Laine
 Martin Landau
 Harry Lauter
 Cloris Leachman
 Ruta Lee
 Suzanne Lloyd
 June Lockhart
 Robert Loggia
 Julie London
 Jack Lord
 Peter Lorre
 Gavin MacLeod
 Jock Mahoney
 William Marshall
 Dean Martin
 Strother Martin
 Carole Mathews
 Frank Maxwell
 Mercedes McCambridge
 Darren McGavin
 Victor McLaglen
 Burgess Meredith
 Dina Merrill
 Emile Meyer
 Robert Middleton
 Vera Miles
 Martin Milner
 Elizabeth Montgomery
 Terry Moore
 Agnes Moorehead
 Ed Nelson
 Leslie Nielsen
 Leonard Nimoy
 Warren Oates
 Margaret O'Brien
 Dan O'Herlihy
 Susan Oliver
 J. Pat O'Malley
 Debra Paget
 Michael Pate
 Luana Patten
 Slim Pickens
 Walter Pidgeon
 Edward Platt
 Denver Pyle
 Claude Rains
 Cesar Romero
 Mickey Rooney
 Marion Ross
 Albert Salmi
 William Schallert
 Robert F. Simon
 Everett Sloane
 Harry Dean Stanton
 Barbara Stanwyck
 Bob Steele
 Charles Stevens
 Woody Strode
 Barbara Stuart
 Olive Sturgess
 Gloria Talbott
 Rip Torn
 Audrey Totter
 Forrest Tucker
 Miyoshi Umeki
 Lee Van Cleef
 Dick Van Patten
 James Whitmore
 Frank Wilcox
 Robert J. Wilke
 Chill Wills
 Marie Windsor
 Hank Worden
 Ed Wynn
 Dick York
 John Zaremba

Episodes

Background and production

Series producer Charles Marquis Warren based Rawhide on three sources:
 Cattle Empire is the movie that he directed in 1958 and for which Endre Bohem was a screenwriter and Paul Brinegar, Steve Raines, Rocky Shahan, and Charles H. Gray were actors; all also worked in Rawhide.
 Chisholm Trail is the classic novel by Borden Chase that inspired the epic motion picture Red River starring John Wayne and Montgomery Clift. 
 The diary of trail boss George C. Duffield was written during a cattle drive from San Antonio to Sedalia in 1866. The narrations with which Gil Favor begins each episode are similar in style and breadth to the entries in Duffield's journal, lending the show an extra measure of authenticity.

Filming for the first season of Rawhide took place at Universal-International Studios in Hollywood. The extensive railroad scenes in the third season were filmed in one month on the Sierra Railroad in Tuolumne County, California.

The premiere episode of Rawhide reached the top 20 in the Nielsen ratings.

The show had a grueling production schedule, being mostly weekly with a three- to four-month break between seasons. After the first season of 22 episodes, seasons two to seven were each 30 episodes. Often, the only way the lead actors could get a break was if they were said to be off on business. On rare occasions, the show featured a small number of the actors and some misfortune, maybe in a town, which would give the others time off.

Eric Fleming drowned at the age of 41 when a canoe flipped over on location in Peru six weeks into filming the movie High Jungle in 1966. The picture was abandoned as a result.

Theme song

The theme song's lyrics were written by Ned Washington in 1958. It was composed by Dimitri Tiomkin and sung by pop singer Frankie Laine. The theme song became very popular, and was covered several times and featured in movies such as The Blues Brothers and Shrek 2.

Title sequence
The eighth and final season's title sequence was animated by Ken Mundie of DePatie-Freleng Enterprises.

Release

Home media

CBS DVD (distributed by Paramount) has released all eight seasons of Rawhide on DVD in Region 1.

On May 12, 2015, CBS DVD released Rawhide- The Complete Series on DVD in Region 1.

In Region 2, Rawhide has been released in Scandinavia: Season 1, by Noble Entertainment, two boxes, 2009–2010, season one re-releasing in January 2014 by Soulmedia, seasons 2 and 3, by Soulmedia (season 2 in two boxes, and season 3 in four boxes). No more seasons will be released in Scandinavia.

Revelation Films has released the first three seasons on DVD in the UK. Season 4 will be released on March 23, 2015, followed by season 5 on June 22, 2015. They are released as complete season sets rather than two volumes.

In Region 4, Madman Entertainment has released all eight seasons on DVD in Australia, with each season in one box. Season 8, the Final Season, was released on October 5, 2011. DVD releases play heavily on Clint Eastwood's later fame, depicting him in the foreground as the chief character and crediting: "Clint Eastwood in...", but the original show credits for seasons one to seven actually depict the late Eric Fleming (as Gil Favor) being the lead cast member, with Eastwood as co-star (excepting a few later episodes where Eastwood is the sole star).

On the Region 1 DVD sets, the episode "Incident of the Roman Candles" is included on both the Season One DVD set and the Season Two Volume One DVD set. 
Similarly, the episode "Abilene" is included on both the Season Four Volume Two DVD set and the Season Five Volume Two DVD set.

Response

Nielsen Ratings

Adaptions

Books 
In 1961, Signet Books published a paperback original novel called Rawhide by Frank C. Robertson based upon the television show.  Eric Fleming as Gil Favor and Clint Eastwood as Rowdy Yates are both on the front cover of the book. The book follows Favor, Yates, Wishbone, and others as they try to get their herd to Sedalia ahead of a rival's herd. The book was published multiple times with the last run printed in 1986.

Comics 

The TV show was also adapted into a comic book by Dan Spiegle, distributed by Dell Comics.

References

External links

Rawhide  at FiftiesWeb.com

The Legend of Rawhide - The Katy Depot, Sedalia, Missouri
The Eric Fleming Information Base

1959 American television series debuts
1966 American television series endings
Television series set in the 1860s
English-language television shows
Black-and-white American television shows
CBS original programming
Television series by CBS Studios
1950s Western (genre) television series
Television shows adapted into novels
Television shows adapted into comics
1960s Western (genre) television series